This is a list of fighter aces in World War II from the Independent State of Croatia, a puppet state of Nazi Germany from 1941–45, created in the portion of Yugoslavia occupied by the Axis powers. There were 25 fighter aces from the Independent State of Croatia, fighting for the Axis, during the Second World War. For other countries see List of World War II flying aces by country.

A

B 
{|class="wikitable" style="width:100%;"
|-
!width="22%"|Name
!width="17%"|Rank
!width="8%"|Total wartime victories
!width="15%"|Unit
!width="38%"|Notes
|-
| Božidar Bartulović || NarednikSergeant|| 8 || || Sentenced to 15 years in jail in Federal People's Republic of Yugoslavia. Released in 1954.
|-
| Ljudevit Bencetić || SatnikCaptain|| 16 || ||
|-
| Safet Boškić || NatporučnikFirst Lieutenant || 13 || || Iron Cross 2nd Class
|}

 C 
Mato Culinovic 
Zivko Culinovic

 D 
Mato Dukovac
Eivko Dzhal (Zivko Dzal)  
Franjo Džal 

 F 
Vladimir Ferencina

 G 
Cvitan Galić
Dragutin Gazapi

 H 
Josip Hellebrant

 I 
Dragutin Ivanic

 J 
Josip Jelacic 
Ivan Jergovic 

 K 
Tomislav Kauzlaric
Josip Kranjc

 L 
Jure Lasta 

 M 
Stjepan Martinashevic
Eduard Martinko 
Veco Mikovic

 R 
Stjepan Radic 

 S 
Albin Starc
Zlatko Stipčić

References
 Notes

 Bibliography

 Ciglic, Boris and Dragan Savic.Croatian Aces of World War II'' (Osprey Aircraft of the Aces - 49). London: Oxford, 2002. .

Croatia
World War II aces from Croatia
World War II aces from Croatia
World War II aces from Croatia